One Take Radio Sessions is a compilation of live-in-studio tracks by British singer-songwriter and guitarist Mark Knopfler, released on 21 June 2005 by Mercury Records internationally and Warner Bros. Records in the United States. The tracks were recorded in one take at Shangri-la Studios in Malibu, California. The record contains live in-studio versions of seven songs from the 2004 album Shangri-La and one song, "Rüdiger", from the album Golden Heart. This release is in fact an extended version of The Trawlerman's Song EP, featuring two more tracks and a revised version of the title track.

Critical reception

In his review for AllMusic, James Christopher Monger gave the record two out of five stars. Although Monger thought "the playing is top-notch, the recording impeccable, and the tunes are strong", he felt that the release offered nothing new that had not been previously delivered on the 2004 album Shangri-La.

Track listing
All songs were written by Mark Knopfler.

Personnel
Music
 Mark Knopfler – vocals, guitar
 Richard Bennett – guitar
 Jim Cox, Matt Rollings – keyboards
 Doug Pettibone – guitar (tracks 2 and 5), mandolin (track 8)
 Glenn Worf – bass guitar
 Chad Cromwell – drums

Production
 Mark Knopfler – producer
 Chuck Ainlay – producer, engineer
 Rodney Pearson – digital editing
 Bob Ludwig – mastering

References

Mark Knopfler albums
Albums recorded at Shangri-La (recording studio)
2005 compilation albums